Kidderminster railway station is the main station serving the large town of Kidderminster, Worcestershire, England and the wider Wyre Forest district. The station is operated by West Midlands Trains, and is on the Birmingham to Worcester via Kidderminster Line. Regular commuter services run to Birmingham and Worcester, with several direct daily services to/from London Marylebone. It shares its station approach with the adjacent Severn Valley Railway station.

Facilities
There is a large car park for 400 cars, administered by West Midlands Trains, in part of the old goods yard between the two railway stations. The Severn Valley Railway has its own car park on the town centre side of their station.

The station has a booking office, a newsagents/snack bar, a BT Phone Box, a cash point and a ticket machine.

In 2009 a footbridge (with lifts) was opened, transforming access between the platforms. Before this work, it was via the road overbridge.

Prior to its demolition, the signal box (a short distance to the south of the station) was known as Kidderminster Junction. This controlled the junction to the Severn Valley Line until its closure in the 1970s.

Severn Valley Railway terminus
The Severn Valley Railway's southern terminus shares the same station approach road and is known as Kidderminster Town to distinguish it from the National Rail station. This also reflects the GWR tradition of suffixing the station name with "Town" if it was closer to the main body of the town served than that of its competitor(s), which Kidderminster Town achieves to the tune of around 60 yards.

History
Kidderminster station opened with the extension of the Oxford, Worcester and Wolverhampton railway from Worcester to Stourbridge on 1 May 1852. It became an important intermediate station on the line which became part of the West Midland Railway (WMR) in 1860. In turn, the WMR amalgamated with the Great Western Railway (GWR) and the South Wales Railway on 1 August 1863.

From about 1900, there was a brisk passenger trade of tourists and day trippers from the West Midlands conurbation.

Due to dwindling passenger numbers, the Severn Valley Line closed to through traffic in 1963. North of Bewdley, the line closed completely in early 1969 when Alveley colliery was shut down and freight traffic ceased.

Passenger services on the Kidderminster, Bewdley and Hartlebury section were withdrawn on 3 January 1970.

The halt of traffic to Stourport power station in 1979, and Kidderminster - Foley Park sugar corporation traffic in 1982 saw the end of regular British Rail services off the main line.

Station buildings
The earliest station building was replaced by another in 1859. In 1863 the second building was destroyed by fire, and a third station building of a mock Tudor design was built to replace it. This survived until 1968 when it was demolished owing to the effects of dry rot and replaced by British Rail in 1974 with a small utilitarian brick building. 

As passenger numbers grew, this building became inadequate, and funding for a new building was secured in February 2015, with a new £4.3 million design announced in July 2017. Originally due to open in summer 2019, the new glass fronted building, which is twice the size of the previous one, was eventually opened in June 2020.

Services

Most trains using the station are operated by West Midlands Railway as part of the Snow Hill Lines.

The standard off peak service in trains per hour (tph) is:

2 tph to Worcester (either Foregate Street or Shrub Hill), of which some continue to Great Malvern.

Most West Midlands Railway services are operated by Class 172 diesel multiple units.

The service between Kidderminster and Birmingham is heavily used, by both commuters and shoppers to Birmingham. The service was increased from three to four trains per hour in 2006.

The other company which operates trains is Chiltern Railways to London. Their services are:

4 morning trains to London Marylebone in the morning peak;
4 returning from London over the evening peak times

Future
The area has had upgraded signalling and a new connection to the Severn Valley Railway, enabling passenger trains to access the branch in both directions. Electrification of the route is an aspiration of Network Rail and the local rail user group. A service to/from NR metals to Bewdley has also been proposed over the years. This is finally seeing some more local interest.

Sources

Further reading

External links

Rail Around Birmingham and the West Midlands: Kidderminster station

Buildings and structures in Kidderminster
Railway stations in Worcestershire
DfT Category D stations
Former Great Western Railway stations
Railway stations in Great Britain opened in 1852
Railway stations served by Chiltern Railways
Railway stations served by West Midlands Trains
1852 establishments in England